Qaleh Sorkh (also Romanized as Qal‘eh Sorkh and Qal‘eh-e Sorkh) is a village in Bala Velayat Rural District, Bala Velayat District, Bakharz County, Razavi Khorasan Province, Iran. At the 2006 census, its population was 678, in 154 families.

References 

Populated places in Bakharz County